Winslow Ogden McCleary (19 May 1886 – 20 December 1973) was a Canadian rowing coxswain. He competed in the men's eight event at the 1912 Summer Olympics.

References

1886 births
1973 deaths
Canadian male rowers
Olympic rowers of Canada
Rowers at the 1912 Summer Olympics
Rowers from Toronto
Coxswains (rowing)